The 2021 FA Vase Final was the 47th final of the Football Association's cup competition for teams at levels 9–11 of the English football league system. The match was contested between Binfield, of the Hellenic League Premier Division, and Warrington Rylands 1906, of the North West Counties League Premier Division.

Route to the Final

Binfield

Warrington Rylands

Match

Details

References

FA Vase Finals
FA Vase Final
Events at Wembley Stadium
FA Vase Final
FA Vase Final 2021